The Sachsenwald is a forest near Hamburg, Germany. It is an unincorporated area in the amt Hohe Elbgeest. It derives its name (which means 'Saxon woods' in English) from being located in the former Duchy of Saxe-Lauenburg, earlier also called Lower Saxony, now mostly covered by the Herzogtum Lauenburg (Duchy of Lauenburg) district. The Sachsenwald has an area of 68 km2. It was given to Otto von Bismarck in 1871 for his achievements for Germany. Today the managed forest area amounts to about 6,000 hectares, of which 4,500 still belong to the House of Bismarck, residing at Friedrichsruh. From 1989, Ferdinand von Bismarck sold 2,250 hectares to the shipowner Eberhart von Rantzau, owner of the Deutsche Afrika-Linien.

References

Information about the Sachsenwald 

Forests and woodlands of Schleswig-Holstein
Unincorporated areas of Germany